Dicky, Dickey, Dickie, or plurals thereof may refer to:


Clothing
 Dickey (garment), a type of false shirt-front
 Dickies, a brand of clothing

People
 Dicky (name), a list of persons with the given name or nickname
 Dickey (name), a list of persons with the surname, nickname or given name
 Dickie (name), a list of persons with the nickname, surname or given name
 Dickie Valentine, stage name of English pop singer Richard Maxwell (1929-1971)

Places
 Dickey, Georgia, an unincorporated community
 Dickeys, Illinois, an unincorporated community
 Dickey County, North Dakota
 Dickey, North Dakota, a city
 Dickey River, Washington state
 Dickey Glacier, Ross Dependency, Antarctica

Other uses
 USS Dicky (SP-231), a boat
 The Dickies, a musical group
 Dickey's Barbecue Pit, an American restaurant chain
 Trunk (car), a storage space in a car, called a dickie or dicky in Southeast Asia

See also
 Dicky, dickie, or dickey seat, a rumble seat in British English